Tablillas was a Medieval Spanish technique of torture for slowly squeezing and crushing the toes and fingers by means of pillories and wedges.

Description and procedure
The tablillas was an auxiliary torture used to increase the effectiveness of other tortures that could be applied while the prisoner was bound to the rack and stretched to the point where his fingers and toes were tense. The tabllilas per se were a set of four small pillories, one for each foot and hand, each equipped with five narrow holes.  The prisoner's toes and fingers were forced into the holes, after which thin wedges were introduced into the holes from the opposite direction.  Slowly hammering each wedge into its hole bit by bit cruelly squeezed the entrapped toe or finger with increasing pressure until its tiny bones were shattered.  The ponderous style of the only writer to comment in detail on the torture of the tablillas may be paraphrased as follows: "The torture of the tablillas is rarely given, the subject trussed up as for the torture of water and cords; having not obtained confession, four palm-sized tablillas are brought, each with five narrow finger-width or toe-width holes, and to give grave pain they hammer a wedge, bit by bit, between the hole and the trapped finger or toe, one after the other; and the fingers and toes are so crushed and beaten, and the torture quite remarkably savage that rarely do the judges exhaust the wedges, for some faint and others confess the crime."

Precursors
The Larousse article also cites a putative ancient Spartan torture device, the δακτυλήθρα (daktylēthra, Gk., thimble), featuring finely threaded iron jaws between which toes were slowly crushed. One questions the historical accuracy of the claim that such an instrument could be engineered in ancient times. However, it is conceivable that such a device could be manufactured, albeit extremely crudely, of bronze.

Iron mallets that could be employed ad hoc to shatter the bones of the fingers and toes were standard equipment in medieval European torture chambers. Toes were also torn from the feet with iron pincers or had their nails slowly extracted with forceps or, with remarkable cruelty, by slowly hammering sharp, thin iron wedges or stout needles known as bodkins under the toenails.

References

Medieval instruments of torture
European instruments of torture